The Institute for the Study of Labor awards a prize each year (from 2016 on every two years in turn with the IZA Young Labor Economist Award) for outstanding academic achievement in the field of labor economics. The IZA Prize in Labor Economics has become a highly prestigious science award in international economics, is the only international science prize awarded exclusively to labor economists and is considered the most important award in labor economics worldwide. The prize was established in 2002 and is awarded annually through a nomination process and decided upon by the IZA Prize Committee, which consists of internationally renowned labor economists. As a part of the prize, all IZA Prize Laureates contribute a volume as an overview of their most significant findings to the IZA Prize in Labor Economics Series published by Oxford University Press.

Funding and prize components 
The IZA Prize in Labor Economics consists of a prize medal and a cash award of 50,000 euros. This provides the monetary support for the recipients' past and future research and is meant to stimulate further labor market research.

Nomination and selection process 
IZA has a worldwide network of over 1,300 labor economists who collaborate as research fellows with the institute. Each year they nominate candidates for the IZA Prize in Labor Economics from the research and work of their peers and colleagues. The nominations are reviewed by the IZA Prize Committee, which consists of IZA representatives, Research Fellows and prominent international labor economists.

IZA Prize Committee 
Since the establishment of the prize, five Nobel laureates in Economics have served as members of the Prize Committee, George Akerlof, Gary Becker, James Heckman, Joseph Stiglitz and David Card. The committee is coordinated by Daniel S. Hamermesh. Current members of the committee besides Hamermesh are: Francine D. Blau (Cornell University), Richard Blundell (University College London), George Borjas (Harvard University), David Card (University of California, Berkeley), and Shelly Lundberg (University of California, Santa Barbara).

IZA Prize in Labor Economics Series 
As a part of the IZA Prize in Labor Economics, each Laureate produces a volume for the IZA Prize in Labor Economics Book Series  consisting of their most significant findings. The Series covers a broad range of important issues in labor economics. The series is published by Oxford University Press.

IZA Prize Laureates 
The past winners of the IZA Prize include a number of influential labor economists who are active in policy advice. For example, Edward Lazear was Chairman of the Council of Economic Advisers under President George W. Bush. Alan Krueger was nominated for the same post by President Barack Obama.

See also

 List of economics awards

References

External links 
 IZA Prize Homepage
 IZA Prize Series at OUP

Economics awards